Convoy SC 94 was the 94th of the numbered series of World War II Slow Convoys of merchant ships from Sydney, Cape Breton Island, Nova Scotia, to Liverpool. The ships departed Sydney on 31 July 1942 and were met by Mid-Ocean Escort Force Group C-1.

Background
As western Atlantic coastal convoys brought an end to the Second Happy Time, Admiral Karl Dönitz, the Befehlshaber der U-Boote (commander in chief of U-boats), shifted focus to the mid-Atlantic to avoid aircraft patrols. Although convoy routing was less predictable in the mid-ocean, Dönitz anticipated that the increased numbers of U-boats being produced would be able to effectively search the area with the advantage of intelligence gained through B-Dienst decryption of British Naval Cypher Number 3. However, only 20 percent of the 180 trans-Atlantic convoys sailing from the end of July 1942 until the end of April 1943 lost ships to U-boat attack.

Battle

Discovery on 5 August
 reported the convoy on 5 August and torpedoed the Dutch freighter Spar.

Attack of 6 August
Assiniboines Type 286 radar spotted  in a heavy fog on 6 August. The destroyer closed on the contact and briefly spotted the submarine twice before losing her in the fog. The range was too close for Assiniboines  guns to engage, but her .50-calibre machine guns shot up the submarine's deck and conning tower. This kept the Germans from manning their  deck gun, but the  flak gun was already manned and firing. It punched holes through the destroyer's plating that set some petrol tanks on the deck afire and disabled 'A' gun. The destroyer was unable to ram U-210 until the rear 4.7-inch gun hit the conning tower, killing the entire bridge crew and the .50-caliber machine guns were able to silence the flak gun. This caused Lieutenant Sorber, the senior surviving officer, to order the submarine to dive, but this meant that she had to hold a straight course while doing so. Assiniboine was able to take advantage of this and rammed U-210 abaft the conning tower whilst she was diving. This caused the electric motors to fail, damaged her propellers and led to water entering the submarine, as a result of which Sorber ordered the ballast tanks to be blown and the submarine to be abandoned. The destroyer rammed her again when U-210 resurfaced, dropped a pattern of depth charges set to detonate at shallow depth and hit her one more time with a 4.7-inch shell before the submarine finally sank.

Attack of 8 August
 torpedoed the British freighter Anneberg and American freighter Kaimoku on the afternoon of 8 August while  torpedoed the British freighters Kelso and Trehata and Greek freighter Mount Kassion. Three undamaged ships were abandoned in the resulting panic. One of them, the British freighter Radchurch, was later torpedoed by U-176.  The Shakespeare-class destroyer leader  and the Polish destroyer  arrived to reinforce the escort, while Dianthus left the convoy to repair damage incurred while ramming and sinking U-379.

Attack of 10 August
 torpedoed the Greek freighter Condylis in daylight on 10 August while  torpedoed the British freighters Cape Race, Empire Reindeer and Oregon.  The remainder of the convoy reached Liverpool on 13 August.

Ships in the convoy

Allied merchant ships
A total of 35 merchant vessels joined the convoy, either in Sydney or later in the voyage.

Convoy escorts
A series of armed military ships escorted the convoy at various times during its journey.

See also
 Convoy Battles of World War II

Notes

References

 
 
 
 
 

SC094
Naval battles of World War II involving Canada
C